Dan Feyen is an American printer and politician who currently serves as a Republican member of the Wisconsin State Senate.

Biography

Born in New Holstein, Wisconsin, in Calumet County, he graduated from New Holstein High School in 1986 and received a diploma in printing from Fox Valley Technical College, in Grand Chute, Wisconsin, in 1988, going to work in the printing and bindery business.  Feyen now resides in Fond du Lac, Wisconsin, and was elected there to the Wisconsin State Senate in 2016 as a Republican, representing the 18th senatorial district (central Fond du Lac County and the south half of Winnebago County, including the cities of Oshkosh and Fond du Lac).

Feyen was elected by his caucus as Assistant Majority Leader for the 2019-2020 session.  He is chairman of the Committee on Commerce and Trade and vice chair of the Committee on Utilities and Housing.  He also sits on the committees on economic development; insurance, financial services, government oversight and courts; senate organization; and the joint committee on legislative organization.

He is a member of the Knights of Columbus and the Elks Club.

References

External links
 Senator Dan Feyen -  Senate District 18 at Wisconsin Legislature
 
 

Year of birth missing (living people)
Living people
Politicians from Fond du Lac, Wisconsin
Fox Valley Technical College alumni
American printers
Republican Party Wisconsin state senators
21st-century American politicians